Anderson Uchôa dos Santos (born 4 February 1991 in Aracaju), or simply Anderson Uchôa, is a Brazilian footballer. He currently plays for Remo.

Honours

Fortaleza
Campeonato Brasileiro Série B: 2018

Paysandu
Campeonato Paraense: 2020

Remo
Copa Verde: 2021
Campeonato Paraense: 2022

References

External links
 Anderson Uchôa at playmakerstats.com (English version of ogol.com.br)
 

1991 births
Living people
Brazilian footballers
Cruzeiro Esporte Clube players
Associação Desportiva Cabofriense players
Villa Nova Atlético Clube players
Ipatinga Futebol Clube players
Avaí FC players
Criciúma Esporte Clube players
Clube Atlético Bragantino players
Paraná Clube players
Fortaleza Esporte Clube players
Associação Ferroviária de Esportes players
Paysandu Sport Club players
Clube do Remo players
Association football midfielders